Ibzan or Ivtzan ( ’Īḇṣān; ; , meaning "illustrious")  appears in the Hebrew Bible as the ninth of the Judges of Israel.

Biography
Little is said of Ibzan apart from this: 

Many scholars believe that the Bethlehem referred to in this passage is the Bethlehem in the territory of the Tribe of Zebulun, in Galilee (Joshua 19:15), rather than the more famous Bethlehem in the Tribe of Judah.

However, the Talmud (Bava Batra 91a) asserts that Ibzan is to be identified with Boaz from the Book of Ruth, who lived in the Bethlehem in Judah, and that he consummated his marriage with Ruth on the last night of his life.

See also 
 Biblical judges
 Book of Judges

References

External links 
 

Judges of ancient Israel
12th-century BCE Hebrew people
Tribe of Judah